Verpulus is a genus of harvestmen in the family Sclerosomatidae from South and Southeast Asia.

Species
 Verpulus brunneus Roewer, 1955
 Verpulus curvitarsus (Suzuki, 1977)
 Verpulus gracilis Roewer, 1955
 Verpulus gravelyi (Roewer, 1929)
 Verpulus kanoi Suzuki, 1967
 Verpulus laevipes Roewer, 1955
 Verpulus magnus Roewer, 1955
 Verpulus marginatus Roewer, 1912
 Verpulus monticola (Roewer, 1955)
 Verpulus peguensis Roewer, 1955
 Verpulus promeus (Roewer, 1955)
 Verpulus ramosus (Suzuki, 1977)
 Verpulus spumatus Simon, 1901

References

Harvestmen
Harvestman genera